James Hay, 2nd Earl of Carlisle (1612 – 30 October 1660) was the Earl of Carlisle (2nd Creation), succeeding James Hay, 1st Earl of Carlisle. Hay was the second son of the 1st Earl, a Scottish nobleman, and his wife Honoria, heir to Edward Denny, 1st Earl of Norwich.

James Hay was Colonel of a Regiment of Foot in Germany, and was appointed Knight of the Order of the Bath.

In 1632 he married Margaret Russell, third daughter of Francis Russell, 4th Earl of Bedford. In 1639 he inherited the Carlisle Islands, later called Barbados. Between 1642 and 1646 he was a Royalist Colonel of a Regiment of Horse. He lived mainly in Barbados but returned in 1652. He died without issue on 30 October 1660. At his death, the peerage became extinct in the Hay family.

References

Catalogue note for a Portrait of James Hay, by Anthony van Dyck

|-

|-

1612 births
1660 deaths
02
Lord-Lieutenants of Essex